Palež may refer to several places:

Bosnia and Herzegovina
 Palež (Višegrad), village
 Palež (Srebrenica), village
 Gornji Palež, village in the municipality of Kiseljak
 Donji Palež, village in the municipality of Kiseljak

Montenegro
 Palež, Žabljak, village

Serbia
 Palež. former name of the town of Obrenovac